Thygater is a genus of bees belonging to the family Apidae.

The species of this genus are found in Central and South America.

Species:

Thygater aethiops 
Thygater anae 
Thygater analis 
Thygater carijo 
Thygater chaetaspis 
Thygater cockerelli 
Thygater colombiana 
Thygater crawfordi 
Thygater danunciae 
Thygater dispar 
Thygater hirtiventris 
Thygater laevis 
Thygater latitarsis 
Thygater luederwaldti 
Thygater melanotricha 
Thygater mexicana 
Thygater micheneri 
Thygater minarum 
Thygater montezuma 
Thygater mourei 
Thygater nigropilosa 
Thygater oliveirae 
Thygater palliventris 
Thygater paranaensis 
Thygater rubricata 
Thygater seabrai 
Thygater sordidipennis 
Thygater tuberculata 
Thygater ubirajarai 
Thygater xanthopyga

References

Apidae